Miss Madagascar is a national Beauty pageant in Madagascar.

History

Miss Madagascar was founded in 1960 as part of the festivities of the country's independence from France. Rajaobelina Bedovoahangy became the first woman from Madagascar to participate in Miss World 1960. Ever since its inception, the organization of the national beauty contest has experienced several years of hiatus at different intervals. The winners of Miss Madagascar traditionally competed in Miss World. In 1998, Helen Hodgson, a Madagascar-based British businesswoman, took over the reins of Comite Miss Madagascar and brought the country back to Miss World. Today, Miss Madagascar is organized by Comite Miss Madagascar and TVM under the auspices of the Office of the First Lady of Madagascar.

Titleholders

 Notes:
 Complete list of the names of the winners of all editions of Miss Madagascar is not available.
 Miss Madagascar is a registered trademark and the contest is not related to Miss RTA Madagascar or Miss Earth Madagascar.

Big Four pageants representatives

Miss World Madagascar

Madagascar has competed in Miss World since 1960. The Winner on Miss Madagascar national competition automatically will compete at the Miss World pageant, but not in 2002, 2012, 2015 and 2016 where the winner of Miss Madagascar did not compete in Miss World.

Miss International Madagascar

Madagascar has competed in Miss International since 1961. The Runner-up on Miss Madagascar national competition automatically will compete at the Miss International pageant, but not since 1962-2017. Where 2018 was the first time ever, Madagascar back after 57 years not competed in Miss International beauty pageant and marks their first placement in the Big Four international beauty pageants, with Esmeralda Rokotosan Lombardin Malleka, who's placed in the Top 10 at Miss International 2018 held in Tokyo - Japan.

References

External links
 Official website

Madagascar
Madagascar
Recurring events established in 1960
Entertainment events in Madagascar
Malagasy awards